José Pozas Checa (born May 14, 1992) is a Spanish professional basketball player for Real Betis Baloncesto of the Liga ACB.

References

Living people
1992 births
Baloncesto Málaga players
CB Valladolid players
Obradoiro CAB players
Point guards
Real Betis Baloncesto players
Spanish men's basketball players
Sportspeople from Málaga